Alessandro Di Paolantonio (born 31 December 1992) is an Italian footballer who plays as a midfielder for  club Monterosi.

Career
He made his Serie C debut for Teramo on 30 August 2014 in a game against Pisa.

On 9 November 2018 he joined Avellino, in Serie D at the time and advanced with it to Serie C at the end of the 2018–19 season.

On 28 August 2021, he signed with Monterosi, freshly promoted to Serie C. On 25 January 2022, he moved on loan to Foggia.

References

External links
 
 

1992 births
Living people
People from Teramo
Footballers from Abruzzo
Italian footballers
Association football midfielders
Serie C players
Lega Pro Seconda Divisione players
Serie D players
S.S. Teramo Calcio players
Ternana Calcio players
U.S. Viterbese 1908 players
U.S. Avellino 1912 players
S.S. Arezzo players
Monterosi Tuscia F.C. players
Calcio Foggia 1920 players
Sportspeople from the Province of Teramo